Aspergillus xerophilus is a species of fungus in the genus Aspergillus. It is from the Aspergillus section. The species was first described in 1975. It has been reported to produce bisanthrons, dihydroauroglaucin, echinulins, erythroglaucin, isoechinulins, neoechinulins, physcion, sulochrin, and tetracyclic.

References

Further reading
 

xerophilus
Fungi described in 1975